April Holmes (born 11 March 1973) is a Paralympic athlete from the USA competing mainly in category T44 sprint events.

Biography
Holmes grew up in Somerdale, New Jersey. She competed in the 2004 Summer Paralympics in Athens, Greece, where she won a bronze medal in the women's Long jump – F44/46 event, finished sixth in the women's 100 metres – T46 event, with a world T44 record and finished seventh in the women's 200 metres – T46 event.  She also competed at the 2008 Summer Paralympics in Beijing, China, winning a gold medal in the women's 100 metres – T44 event, and the 2012 Summer Paralympics in London, winning a bronze medal in the women's 100 metres – T44 event.

Data
Training Location: Chula Vista, CA
Hometown: Somerdale, NJ
Classification:  Below the knee Amputee (T-44)
Disability acquired:  Train accident (January 2001)
Coach: Al Joyner (1984 Olympic Gold Medalist- Triple Jump)
Education:   BS Mass Communication (Norfolk St. University)
MBA Marketing (University of Phoenix)
Sponsors: Jordan Brand, Ossur Prosthetics, US *Paralympics, Hartford Insurance

Major achievements 
 2012: Bronze medal, 100m (T44) – Paralympic Games, London
 2011: Bronze medal, 100m (T44) – IPC Athletics World Championships, Christchurch, New Zealand 
 2008:  Gold medal, 100m – Paralympic Games, Beijing, China 
 2008: Three gold medals, 100m, 200m and Long Jump – U.S. Paralympic Track & Field Championships, Phoenix, Ariz. 
 2008: World record 200m T44/F44 (27.10)- Boiling Point Track Classic 
 2007: Three gold medals, 100m, 200m and Long Jump – U.S. Paralympic Track & Field National Championships, Marietta, Ga. 
 2006: Two gold medals, 100m, 200m; Bronze medal, Long Jump – 2006 IPC Athletics World Championships, Assen, The Netherlands 
 2006: Two world records, 100m (12.98), 200m (27.10) – U.S. Paralympics Track & Field National Championships, Atlanta, Ga. 
 2006: Gold medal, long jump – Visa Paralympic World Cup, Manchester, United Kingdom 
 2006: Two gold medals, 100m, 400m – Paralympic Revival, Duderstadt, Germany 
 2006: Bronze medal, long jump – IPC Athletics World Indoor Championships, Sweden 
 2006: Two gold medals, 100m, 200m – German National Championships, Leverkusen, Germany 
 2004: Two world records, 100m, 200m; Bronze medal, long jump – Paralympic Games, Athens, Greece 
 2003: Gold medal, 100m; Silver medal, 200m – Rocky Mountain State Games, Colorado Springs, Colo. 
 2003: Gold medal, 200m – German National Championships, Leverkusen, Germany 
 2002: Silver medal, 100m; Fourth place, 200m – IPC Athletics World Championships, Lille, France 
 2002: First place, 100m – DS/USA's International Challenge, Orlando, Fla.

See also
The Mechanics of Running Blades

External links 
 April Holmes' personal & Foundation Website

References

1973 births
Living people
Paralympic track and field athletes of the United States
Athletes (track and field) at the 2004 Summer Paralympics
Athletes (track and field) at the 2008 Summer Paralympics
Athletes (track and field) at the 2012 Summer Paralympics
Paralympic gold medalists for the United States
Paralympic bronze medalists for the United States
American female sprinters
American female long jumpers
American amputees
Sportspeople from Chula Vista, California
World record holders in Paralympic athletics
Medalists at the 2004 Summer Paralympics
Medalists at the 2008 Summer Paralympics
Medalists at the 2012 Summer Paralympics
People from Somerdale, New Jersey
Paralympic medalists in athletics (track and field)
Medalists at the 2007 Parapan American Games
Sportspeople from Camden County, New Jersey
Track and field athletes from New Jersey
University of Phoenix alumni
Norfolk State Spartans athletes
21st-century American women